Sanger High School is the four-year public high school serving Sanger, California and the rural surrounding community (defined as Sanger and the communities of Centerville, Fairmont, Lone Star, Del Rey, and Tivy Valley).  The official address of the current campus is 1045 Bethel Avenue, Sanger, CA 93657.  The school moved to the new campus and new address in 2001.  The previous location at 1705 10th Street is now Washington Academic Middle School, but still houses the athletic facilities for Sanger High School, including a 10 lane track stadium and a separate football stadium, named after former Raiders coach, Tom Flores.

Based on the school's website, the current student population is 2,893 students (as of the 2022-23 school year), with 71% of these students identifying as Hispanic, 12% white, 13% Asian, 2% African American, and 2% other.

Notable alumni
Luis Ortiz (born 1995), baseball pitcher for the San Francisco Giants

References

High schools in Fresno County, California
Educational institutions established in 1901
Public high schools in California
1901 establishments in California